A Family Affair is an upcoming American romantic comedy film directed by Richard LaGravenese and written by Carrie Solomon. The film stars Nicole Kidman, Zac Efron, Joey King, Liza Koshy, and Kathy Bates.

A Family Affair is scheduled to be released on November 17, 2023, by Netflix.

Premise
A young woman named Zara works as an assistant for movie star Chris Cole. That is until Chris falls in love with her mother.

Cast
 Nicole Kidman
 Zac Efron as Chris Cole
 Joey King as Zara
 Liza Koshy
 Kathy Bates

Production
Filming took place from August 2 to October 18, 2022, in Atlanta.

References

External links
 

2023 films
2023 romantic comedy films
2020s American films
2020s English-language films
American romantic comedy films
English-language Netflix original films
Films about actors
Films about mother–daughter relationships
Films directed by Richard LaGravenese
Films produced by Joe Roth
Films shot in Atlanta
Upcoming English-language films
Upcoming Netflix original films